Yasin Ehliz (born 30 December 1992) is a German professional ice hockey forward who is currently playing for EHC Red Bull München of the Deutsche Eishockey Liga (DEL).

Playing career
A product of Tölzer Löwen, Ehliz moved to the Nürnberg Ice Tigers of the German Deutsche Eishockey Liga (DEL) in 2010. He played for the Ice Tigers in the DEL until 2018 before on 11 June 2018, he signed a one-year, two-way contract with the Calgary Flames of the National Hockey League (NHL). For Calgary's AHL affiliate, the Stockton Heat, he appeared in four games in the early stages of the 2018–19 season. In early November 2018, he was placed on unconditional waivers. He subsequently returned to Germany, and signed with Red Bull München on 7 November 2018.

International play
Ehliz was named to the Germany men's national ice hockey team for competition at the 2014 IIHF World Championship. He won a silver medal with Team Germany at the 2018 Olympic Games and also represented Germany at the 2018 IIHF World Championship.

Career statistics

Regular season and playoffs

International

References

External links

 

1992 births
Living people
German ice hockey right wingers
German people of Turkish descent
Ice hockey players at the 2018 Winter Olympics
Medalists at the 2018 Winter Olympics
EHC München players
Olympic ice hockey players of Germany
Olympic medalists in ice hockey
Olympic silver medalists for Germany
People from Bad Tölz
Sportspeople from Upper Bavaria
Stockton Heat players
Thomas Sabo Ice Tigers players
Ice hockey players at the 2022 Winter Olympics